Koro Airport  is an airport serving Koro, one of the Lomaiviti Islands in Fiji. It is operated by Airports Fiji Limited.

Facilities
It has one grass runway which measures  in length.

It's the only airport in Fiji which has a sloped runway. It only has one weekly flight from Suva-Nausori, with a Britten-Norman Islander from Northern Air.

Airlines and destinations

References

External links
 

Airports in Fiji
Lomaiviti Province
Altiports